Lewisville Independent School District (LISD) is a 127-square mile school district based in Lewisville, Texas (USA) covering all of Lewisville, The Colony, Highland Village, Copper Canyon, and Double Oak as well as portions of Flower Mound, Plano, Carrollton, Frisco, Hebron, Coppell, Grapevine and Argyle.

The recent suburban growth of the Dallas-Fort Worth Metroplex has caused LISD to grow at a great pace, becoming the 94th-largest school district in the United States in 2006. Proximity calculated a 28.56% increase in student population from 2000 to 2006; LISD was declared the 17th largest school district in the State of Texas in 2008.  To help maintain this growth, in May 2008, voters approved a $697 million bond package.

In 2010, the school district was rated "Recognized" by the Texas Education Agency.

History

For several years in the 2000s and 2010s the district grew by about 2,000 pupils annually. In the 2000s the district expected to have its student body reach 60,000 by 2016, but a 2011 study commissioned by the district stated that the student enrollment would peak at 55,000.

In the early twenty-first century, Lewisville ISD high schools began to reach their capacities, prompting the decision by the school board to construct additional ninth and tenth grade campuses for all schools except for The Colony High School. In the case of Edward S. Marcus High School, Flower Mound High School, and Hebron High School, ninth grade centers were built adjascent to the existing campuses. Lewisville High School gained two additional campuses, LHS Killough and LHS Harmon. Ninth and tenth grade students attend both of these campuses, before attending classes on the main campus for their junior and senior years.

In 2013 the district planned to change attendance boundaries of Flower Mound middle schools, causing some controversy in that city.

Athletics 

The 10,000-capacity Max Goldsmith Stadium is the home of the Lewisville Farmers.

1:X
1:X (pronounced 1 to X) is a program implemented across the District of LISD. The program rolled out iPads to the vast majority of LISD Students, and implemented Google Apps specifically for the school district. The goal is to have "The right technology at the right time."

iPad replacement program
Beginning in 2018, 4th graders and current high school students received new 10.5" iPad Pro devices with keyboard cases to replace aging iPad Airs implemented in 2014. Students in grades 5-8 received the exact same iPad Air devices they had before, but with a new Mobile Device Management and a new case with no keyboard. In fall 2019, students in grades 5-8 will be receiving new iPad Pros with keyboards to match the rest of the district.

Fiber network
Starting in 2016 and completing in spring 2018, LISD rolled out a fiber optic network provided by Unite Private Networks, that provides speeds of up to 1 Gbit/s. This network replaced aging cable infrastructure from local ISP Grande Communications. The district also installed a link to the Region XI Educational Service Center.

Schools

High schools 
 Edward S. Marcus High School (1981)
 Flower Mound High School (1999)
 Hebron High School (1999)
 Lewisville High School (1897)
 Killough Lewisville High School North (2005)
 Lewisville High School - Harmon (2010)
 The Colony High School (1986)

Middle schools 
 Arbor Creek Middle School, Carrollton, Texas, feeds into Hebron High School
 Briarhill Middle School
 Creek Valley Middle School
 DeLay Middle School (originally opened in 1974 at the site of the original Lewisville High, relocated to the former Milliken Middle School campus in 2010)
 Clayton Downing Middle School
 Durham Middle School
 Forestwood Middle School feeds into Flower Mound High School (9th grade freshmen attend Flower Mound 9th Grade Campus)
 Griffin Middle School
 Hedrick Middle School
 Huffines Middle School feeds into Killough Lewisville High School North and Lewisville High School
 Killian Middle School (uncertain founded date)
 Lakeview Middle School
 Lamar Middle School (Flower Mound, Texas)
 McKamy Middle School
 Shadow Ridge Middle School

Elementary schools 

 B.B. Owen Elementary 
 Bluebonnet Elementary
 Bridlewood Elementary
 Camey Elementary
 Castle Hills Elementary
 Central Elementary
 By 2006 the school received an addition that allowed for an additional 250 students.
 Coyote Ridge Elementary
 Creekside Elementary
 Degan Elementary
 LISD STEM Academy at Donald Elementary (Became a STEM Academy in 2018)
2006 National Blue Ribbon School
 Ethridge Elementary
 Flower Mound Elementary
1993–94 National Blue Ribbon School
 Forest Vista Elementary
 Garden Ridge Elementary
 Hebron Valley Elementary
 Hedrick Elementary - The 2018–2019 school year was the last year this school operated.
 Heritage Elementary
2000–01 National Blue Ribbon School
 Hicks Elementary
 Highland Village Elementary
1993–94 National Blue Ribbon School
 Homestead Elementary
 Indian Creek Elementary
Independence Elementary (feeds into Killian MS)
 Lakeland Elementary
 Lewisville Elementary
 Liberty Elementary
 Lillie J. Jackson Early Childhood Center, for students that qualify under the TEA Prekindergarten requirements.
 McAuliffe Elementary
 Memorial Elementary STEM academy  
 Mill Street Elementary
 Morningside Elementary
 Old Settlers Elementary
 Parkway Elementary School
 Peters Colony Elementary
 Polser Elementary
 Prairie Trail Elementary
 Rockbrook Elementary
 Southridge Elementary
 Timber Creek Elementary
 Valley Ridge Elementary
 Vickery Elementary
 Wellington Elementary

Other schools 
 Dale Jackson Career Center
 Denton County Juvenile Justice Alternative Education Program (housed at Lewisville Learning Center)
 Lewisville Learning Center (technically classified as a high school). The LLC offers three main programs:
 District Alternative Education Program, for disciplinary students
 Accelerated Division, for grade advancement in both middle and high schools
 Student Age Parenting Program, the only location in LISD to currently offer parenting education classes

Former schools 
Lina Milliken Middle School (opened in 1977, closed in 1997)
After closure as a middle school, the facility was used as the Lewisville High 9th Grade Campus until its new facility opened in 2005, whereupon it was closed and unoccupied.  The facility reopened in fall 2010 as the relocated DeLay Middle School.
1992–93 National Blue Ribbon School
College Street Elementary School (closed in 2019)
Replaced by Mill Street Elementary School, which was completed in October, 2019. The district plans to repurpose the building.
Stewart's Creek Elementary School (Opened 1981, closed early 2021)

See also 
 List of school districts in Texas

References

External links 
 Lewisville Independent School District home page
 Facts and Figures regarding LISD
 1:X home page

 
Lewisville, Texas
School districts in Denton County, Texas
School districts in Tarrant County, Texas
Coppell, Texas
Plano, Texas
Carrollton, Texas
Frisco, Texas
1902 establishments in Texas
School districts established in 1902